Dragan Papazoglu (1804–1807) or Papazoglija was an Ottoman Bulgarian mercenary in Alija Gušanac's Dahije detachment in the Sanjak of Smederevo who switched sides to the Serb rebels during the First Serbian Uprising. 

Born in the village of Studeno buche (now in northwestern Bulgaria), Dragan was the son of an Orthodox priest (hence patronymic Papazoglu and Popović, "son of the priest"). He was at first a mercenary (krdžalija) in the forces of Alija Gušanac (who served the Dahije), with whom he arrived in Serbia. He then left Gušanac's forces and joined the Serbian Revolutionaries. 

He became a bimbaša (major) in Crna Reka. Papazoglija often, as he had done before, crossed deep into Ottoman territory with a strong unit of cavalry and infantry and plundered rich Turks and killed tyrants. During a cease-fire he crossed into Ottoman territory and brought great damage, according to which the Ottomans complained to Russia. 

Serbian supreme commander Karađorđe received an order by the Russians to issue penalties to any who cross into Ottoman territory. Papazoglija, not respecting the order, took 300 cavalrymen and as many infantry and penetrated as far as the field of Sofia. There he killed a Turk hero in a duel, for which he was celebrated. He returned to Crna Reka with great plunder, and was a guest at Petar Džoda's, who at night during his sleep murdered him with an axe. It is said that Hajduk-Veljko and Petar Dobrnjac were involved in the plot.

See also
 List of Serbian Revolutionaries

References

Sources
 
 

Serbian revolutionaries
People of the First Serbian Uprising
Serbian people of Bulgarian descent
Ottoman mercenaries
Serbian murder victims
Bulgarian people murdered abroad
Axe murder
18th-century births
19th-century deaths
Year of birth unknown
Year of death unknown
18th-century Bulgarian people
19th-century Bulgarian people
19th-century Serbian people
People from Montana Province